The men's 200 metre butterfly swimming competition at the 1998 Asian Games in Bangkok was held on 11 December at the Thammasat Aquatic Center.

Schedule
All times are Indochina Time (UTC+07:00)

Results

Heats

Final

References

External links
Official website

Swimming at the 1998 Asian Games